Psyopus (sometimes written as PsyOpus) was an American mathcore band from Rochester, New York.

History
Formed in 2002, the band is noted for the unorthodox and extremely technical guitar techniques of Christopher Arp, often referred to as "Arpmandude", because he mainly uses one technique, tapping. To get endorsement deals from various guitar and amp companies, Arp had to send a live video of himself playing to prove that he could play as fast as he does. Arp considers Psyopus a technically proficient band: "I understand people not understanding us so by default the music comes across as noise but, the music makes sense to us all too much and every 16th note was scrutinized." Regarding learning to play guitar, Arp says: "I learned to play guitar in my bedroom. I got my first guitar in eighth grade. I bought Metallica tablature books, Megadeth books, guitar magazines, didn’t do homework, and just played guitar all night."

The band released their 2nd album Our Puzzling Encounters Considered in February 2007.  The techniques Arp uses have made it even more difficult to receive any endorsement. Arp himself said, "Mesa Boogie has not done very much to sponsor me because I do too much of this," as he raised his guitar by the whammy bar shaking it up and down. The band released their third studio album Odd Senses, on February 17, 2009.

The band entered an extended hiatus in 2010. In 2011, Christopher Arp posted several videos of himself on YouTube explaining the history and eventual hiatus of Psyopus. The hiatus may have been interrupted in 2012 when a photo appeared on Arp's Facebook page showing him with Michael Van Munster and Ike Schultz. A comment on the photo by long-time Psyopus producer, Doug White, showed that he was working with the three in the studio.

In October 2012, 'Metal Injection' revealed that Psyopus would reunite with three of the four original members: Chris Arp, Adam Frappolli, Fred Decoste—with drummer Jason Bauers, who was a member until the hiatus.

On July 17, 2015, a YouTube account named The Infamous Arpmandude posted a video titled 5/21/2013 Chris Arp Imogen's Puzzle and Lecture at the U of R. In the hour and ten-minute video, Arp playing Imogen's Puzzle Pt. 2, and afterward talk about himself, his experiences playing guitar, and gives a quick rundown on the history of Psyopus. He also explains that Psyopus is no longer an active band due to frustrations and hardships.

Members

Final lineup
 Adam Frappolli - lead vocals (2002–2007, 2012)
 Christopher Arp - guitar (2002–2012)
 Fred DeCoste - bass (2002–2007, 2012)
 Jason Bauers - drums, percussion (2007–2012)

Former members
 Brian Woodruff - vocals (2008–2010)
 Greg Herman - drums, percussion (2002–2004) (Shield Your Eyes, Valpurga, Inertia, Kalibas, Low Ton, North American Wildlife)
 Lee Fisher - drums, percussion (2004–2005) (Commit Suicide, Overlord Exterminator, Fawn Limbs)
 Corey Barnes - drums, percussion (2005–2006) (Paria)
 Jon Cole - drums, percussion (2006–2007) (POWERWOLVES, FINISHER)
 Harrison Christy - lead vocals (2007–2008) (The Jefferson Plane Crash)
 Michael Horn - bass (2007–2009) (The Osedax, Mod Flanders Conspiracy)
 Travis Morgan - bass (2009 touring) (Atheist)
 Brian Kelly - bass (2009 touring)
 Brent Glover - bass (2009 touring) (Bellicist, Reciprocal)

Timeline

Discography
2004: Ideas of Reference (Black Market Activities)
2007: Our Puzzling Encounters Considered (Metal Blade)
2009: Odd Senses (Metal Blade)

References

External links
Psyopus article March 2009
Interview with Arp of Psyopus
Way Too Loud interview
hardcoresounds.net interview

Musical groups established in 2002
Heavy metal musical groups from New York (state)
American avant-garde metal musical groups
American progressive metal musical groups
Musical quartets
Metal Blade Records artists
Black Market Activities artists
2002 establishments in New York (state)